The elongate nothobranch (Nothobranchius elongatus) is a species of killifish in the family Nothobranchiidae. It is endemic to the coastal drainages to the north west of Mombasa in Kenya.  Its natural habitat is intermittent freshwater marshes and temporary pools on floodplains.

References

Links
 Nothobranchius elongatus on WildNothos

Fish described in 1982
Elongate
Endemic freshwater fish of Kenya
Taxonomy articles created by Polbot